In numerical analysis, Estrin's scheme (after Gerald Estrin), also known as Estrin's method, is an algorithm for numerical evaluation of polynomials.

Horner's method for evaluation of polynomials is one of the most commonly used algorithms for this purpose, and unlike Estrin's scheme it is optimal in the sense that it minimizes the number of multiplications and additions required to evaluate an arbitrary polynomial. On a modern processor, instructions that do not depend on each other's results may run in parallel. Horner's method contains a series of multiplications and additions that each depend on the previous instruction and so cannot execute in parallel. Estrin's scheme is one method that attempts to overcome this serialization while still being reasonably close to optimal.

Description of the algorithm 
Estrin's scheme operates recursively, converting a degree-n polynomial in x (for n≥2) to a degree- polynomial in x2 using  independent operations (plus one to compute x2).

Given an arbitrary polynomial P(x) = C0 + C1x + C2x2 + C3x3 + ⋯ + Cnxn, one can group adjacent terms into sub-expressions of the form (A + Bx) and rewrite it as a polynomial in x2: P(x) = (C0 + C1x) + (C2 + C3x)x2 + (C4 + C5x)x4 + ⋯ = Q(x2).

Each of these sub-expressions, and x2, may be computed in parallel.  They may also be evaluated using a native multiply–accumulate instruction on some architectures, an advantage that is shared with Horner's method.

This grouping can then be repeated to get a polynomial in x4: P(x) = Q(x2) = ((C0 + C1x) + (C2 + C3x)x2) + ((C4 + C5x)  + (C6 + C7x)x2)x4 + ⋯ = R(x4).

Repeating this +1 times, one arrives at Estrin's scheme for parallel evaluation of a polynomial:

 Compute Di = C2i + C2i+1x for all 0 ≤ i ≤ .  (If n is even, then Cn+1 = 0 and Dn/2 = Cn.)
 If n ≤ 1, the computation is complete and D0 is the final answer.
 Otherwise, compute y = x2 (in parallel with the computation of Di).
 Evaluate Q(y) = D0 + D1y + D2y2  + ⋯ + Dy using Estrin's scheme.

This performs a total of n multiply-accumulate operations (the same as Horner's method) in line 1, and an additional  squarings in line 3.  In exchange for those extra squarings, all of the operations in each level of the scheme are independent and may be computed in parallel; the longest dependency path is +1 operations long.

Examples 
Take Pn(x) to mean the nth order polynomial of the form: Pn(x) = C0 + C1x + C2x2 + C3x3 + ⋯ + Cnxn

Written with Estrin's scheme we have:

 P3(x) = (C0 + C1x) + (C2 + C3x) x2
 P4(x) = (C0 + C1x) + (C2 + C3x) x2 + C4x4
 P5(x) = (C0 + C1x) + (C2 + C3x) x2 + (C4 + C5x) x4
 P6(x) = (C0 + C1x) + (C2 + C3x) x2 + ((C4 + C5x) + C6x2)x4
 P7(x) = (C0 + C1x) + (C2 + C3x) x2 + ((C4 + C5x) + (C6 + C7x) x2)x4
 P8(x) = (C0 + C1x) + (C2 + C3x) x2 + ((C4 + C5x) + (C6 + C7x) x2)x4 + C8x8
 P9(x) = (C0 + C1x) + (C2 + C3x) x2 + ((C4 + C5x) + (C6 + C7x) x2)x4 + (C8 + C9x) x8
 …

In full detail, consider the evaluation of P15(x):
 Inputs: x, C0, C1, C2, C3, C4, C5 C6, C7, C8, C9 C10, C11, C12, C13 C14, C15
 Step 1: x2, C0+C1x, C2+C3x, C4+C5x, C6+C7x, C8+C9x, C10+C11x, C12+C13x, C14+C15x
 Step 2: x4, (C0+C1x) + (C2+C3x)x2, (C4+C5x) + (C6+C7x)x2, (C8+C9x) + (C10+C11x)x2, (C12+C13x) + (C14+C15x)x2
 Step 3: x8, ((C0+C1x) + (C2+C3x)x2) + ((C4+C5x) + (C6+C7x)x2)x4, ((C8+C9x) + (C10+C11x)x2) + ((C12+C13x) + (C14+C15x)x2)x4
 Step 4: (((C0+C1x) + (C2+C3x)x2) + ((C4+C5x) + (C6+C7x)x2)x4) + (((C8+C9x) + (C10+C11x)x2) + ((C12+C13x) + (C14+C15x)x2)x4)x8

References

Further reading 
 fast_polynomial, a Sage library using an improved scheme (extended abstract).

Numerical analysis